The 1989 Winnipeg municipal election was held on October 25, 1989 to elect a mayor, councillors and school trustees in the city of Winnipeg.

Bill Norrie was re-elected to a fifth term as mayor without serious opposition.

Results

Councillors

Mark Miller was a first-time candidate.  There is a Manitoba resident named Mark Miller who serves as executive director of the Manitoba Ozone Protection Industry Association, and who campaigned for the council of the Rural Municipality of Springfield in 2002 and 2006.  It is not clear if this is the same person.

Peter Graham was a first-time candidate.

School trustees

Transcona-Springfield School Division

Electors could vote for three candidates.  Percentages are determined in relation to the total number of votes.

References

1989 elections in Canada
Municipal elections in Winnipeg
1989 in Manitoba
October 1989 events in Canada